Vincent de Paul Ahanda (24 June 1918 – 12 September 1975) was the prime minister of Cameroon in the Federal Republic of Cameroon from 19 June 1965 to 20 November 1965.

References 

Cameroonian politicians
1918 births
1975 deaths